The armoured frog (Ranoidea lorica), or armoured mist frog, is a species of tree frog in the torrent frog complex, a group restricted to north-eastern Queensland, Australia.

Taxonomy 
The armoured mist frog is one of the four species of Australian torrent treefrogs that comprise the Ranoidea nannotis species group. The other species are the mountain mist frog, waterfall frog, and common mist frog.

Description 
It is grey or grey-brown on the dorsal surface and white on the ventral surface. The skin is tubercular on the dorsal surface, prominently on the eyelids and around the tympanum. Fingers are half webbed and toes are fully webbed, both having well-developed discs. The tympanum is small and indistinct, and a vocal sac is not present. Males have black, spiny nuptial pads on their thumbs and "accessory spines" on their chests. These spines are used in amplexus by the males to attain a better grip on the females.

Distribution
Despite once being relatively common, the armoured frog has fallen into rapid decline, and was not seen from 1991 until 2008, when a small population was rediscovered and confirmed to be of this species.

Behaviour and ecology
This species is associated with fast-flowing creeks and streams in rainforests in northern Queensland. The call for this species is unknown, but is likely to be similar to that of the closely related waterfall frog, (Litoria nannotis). Tadpoles of this species are undescribed, although they would theoretically look similar to those of L. nannotis–with a large oral disc and a streamlined body, an adaptation to fast-flowing streams.

Conservation status
This species, along with Taudactylus rheophilus, Taudactylus acutirostris, and some closely related species (including Litoria nannotis, Litoria nyakalensis, and Litoria rheocola) have also declined in flowing creeks in highland rainforests in the same general area inhabited by L. lorica around the early 1990s. The reason for decline of these species is not known, but the disease caused by chytrid fungus may be a factor. The relocated population was found to be infected with the fungus, but seems to have acquired some degree of resistance.

It is listed as Critically Endangered on the IUCN Red List, and as Endangered under Queensland's Nature Conservation Act 1992.

References

Further reading
 Cunningham, M. 2002. Identification and evolution of Australian torrent treefrogs. Memoirs of the Queensland Museum. 48(1):93–102. Brisbane, Qld.
Environmental Protection Agency/Queensland Parks and Wildlife Service – Armoured MistFrog
Department of Environment and Heritage – Armoured MistFrog
Frogs Australia Network
Barker, J.; Grigg, G.C.; Tyler,M.J. (1995). A Field Guide to Australian Frogs. Surrey Beatty & Sons.

External links

 Litoria lorica at CalPhotos

Ranoidea (genus)
Amphibians of Queensland
Critically endangered fauna of Australia
Nature Conservation Act endangered biota
Amphibians described in 1979
Frogs of Australia